Oblomov (translit. Neskolko dney iz zhizni I. I. Oblomov) is a Soviet comedy/drama film directed by Nikita Mikhalkov. It was released by Mosfilm in 1980.  The film's plot is based on the novel Oblomov, written by Ivan Goncharov, which tells the story of Ilya Ilyich Oblomov, a middle-aged nobleman living in 19th century Saint Petersburg. This central character exemplifies the superfluous man concept found in 19th century Russian literature.

Plot
The film begins in 19th century Saint Petersburg, and examines the life of Ilya Ilyich Oblomov, a middle-aged Russian nobleman. Slothful and seemingly unhappy, Oblomov spends much of the beginning of the film sleeping and being attended to by his servant, Zakhar. In an attempt to get him more active, Andrei Ivanovich Stoltz, a Russian/German businessman and close friend, frequently takes Oblomov along with him to social events. Oblomov is introduced to a cultured woman named Olga, a friend of Stoltz. When Stoltz leaves the country, Olga is left with the task of civilizing and culturing Oblomov while he lives nearby. Olga and Oblomov eventually fall in love, but upon Stoltz's return, Oblomov moves back into town, eventually severing ties with Olga. Stoltz and Olga eventually marry, and Oblomov subsequently marries the woman with whom he was living, Agafya Matveyevna Psehnitsyna. The two have a son, and although Agafya has two children from a previous relationship, Oblomov treats them both as if they were his own. Oblomov is satisfied with his life, although it "lack[s] the poetic and those bright rays which he imagined were to be found."

Superfluous Man and Oblomovism
In the Ivan Goncharov novel, Ilya Ilyich Oblomov is considered an excellent example of the "Superfluous Man" concept of 1800s' Russian literature. Alienated and let down by the world around him, the "superfluous man" character is often considered an outsider at odds with society. In both the novel and the film, Oblomov demonstrates this "superfluity" as an ineffective member of Russia's much criticized aristocracy. Goncharov referred to his character's passivity as "Oblomovism," and the term has since been associated with characters who possess Oblomov's apathy and membership in Russia's upper class.

Cast

References

External links

1980 films
1980 comedy-drama films
Films based on Russian novels
Films set in the 1850s
Films set in the Russian Empire
Films set in Saint Petersburg
Films shot in Ukraine
Films directed by Nikita Mikhalkov
Films scored by Eduard Artemyev
Mosfilm films
Russian comedy-drama films
1980s Russian-language films
Soviet comedy-drama films
1980 comedy films
1980 drama films
Films with screenplays by Nikita Mikhalkov